Word Pimpin 2: We Don't Need You is the collaborative effort of hip hop artists Keak Da Sneak of Oakland, California, Baby S of Los Angeles, California and Q-Z, also native to the Bay Area, released in 2008 by Ehustl Entertainment.  This album was preceded  by the original Word Pimpin''' released in 2003, featuring   Baby S, Q-Z and B-Legit.

Track listing
"Monster Words"
"Don't Take It Personal"
"Get Your U On" 
"Cali Hyphy"
"Cali Girls"
"Do It Right"
"Have Some Fun" 
"I Choose You"
"Jello & Chopsticks" 
"Inner City Street Life"
"Stack High" 
"This Way I get It"
"We Don't Need You" 
"White Teez"
"Shake It Shake It" 
"What It Is"
"Do It Right Remix" featuring Snoop Dogg
"Get Your U On Remix" featuring E-40
"Givin Up" featuring Baby S (From Cranshaw and Slauson [2009])
"Back To Life" featuring Keak Da Sneak and San Quinn (From Welcome to Scokland'' [2009])

External links
 Ehustl Entertainment on Myspace
 Keak Da Sneak on Myspace 
 Buy Link

2008 albums
Keak da Sneak albums
Collaborative albums
Sequel albums